Fernando Paixão da Silva (born 7 January 1988), known as Fernando Bob, is a Brazilian footballer who plays as a defensive midfielder.

Club career
Fernando Bob was born in Cabo Frio, Rio de Janeiro, and was a Fluminense youth graduate. He made his first team – and Série A – debut on 23 August 2006, starting in a 3–0 away loss against Palmeiras.

After loans at Paulista, Boavista and Avaí, Fernando Bob returned to Flu for the 2010 campaign and contributed sparingly as his side lifted the league title. Subsequent loans at Atlético Goianiense, Vitória and Ponte Preta followed, and he signed a permanent contract with the latter on 2 January 2015.

On 12 February 2015, Fernando Bob signed a three-year contract with fellow top tier club Internacional. On 16 February 2017, after being rarely used, he returned to Ponte on loan until the end of the year.

On 21 August 2018, Fernando Bob joined Minnesota United FC in Major League Soccer. Bob was released by Minnesota at the end of their 2018 season.

Career statistics

Honours

Club
Fluminense
Campeonato Brasileiro Série A: 2010

Vitória
Campeonato Baiano: 2013

Internacional
Campeonato Gaúcho: 2016

Individual
Campeonato Paulista Team of the year: 2017

References

External links

1988 births
Living people
People from Cabo Frio
Brazilian footballers
Association football midfielders
Campeonato Brasileiro Série A players
Campeonato Brasileiro Série B players
Major League Soccer players
Fluminense FC players
Paulista Futebol Clube players
Boavista Sport Club players
Avaí FC players
Atlético Clube Goianiense players
Esporte Clube Vitória players
Associação Atlética Ponte Preta players
Sport Club Internacional players
Minnesota United FC players
Brazilian expatriate sportspeople in the United States
Expatriate soccer players in the United States
Sportspeople from Rio de Janeiro (state)